Lithocarpus hallieri is a tree in the beech family Fagaceae. It is named for the German botanist Johannes Gottfried Hallier.

Description
The greyish brown bark is smooth, flaky or lenticellate.

Distribution and habitat
Lithocarpus hallieri is endemic to Borneo.

References

hallieri
Endemic flora of Borneo
Trees of Borneo
Plants described in 1906
Flora of the Borneo lowland rain forests
Flora of the Borneo montane rain forests